Embrace the Gutter is the second studio album by Florida metal band The Autumn Offering. It is the last album to feature original vocalist Dennis Miller and original bassist Sean Robbins. After extensive touring alongside bands SOiL and Mushroomhead, The Autumn Offering's second full-length feature has been said to have sold over 15,000 copies in the U.S.

Track listing
 "Prologue" - 0:34
 "Decay" - 3:10
 "The Yearning" - 3:40
 "Embrace the Gutter" - 3:56
 "Ghost" - 4:02
 "Misery" - 3:20
 "This Future Disease" - 3:11
 "One Last Thrill" - 4:08
 "No End in Sight" - 3:32
 "Walk the Line" - 2:19
 "The Final Cut" - 3:21

Personnel
Dennis Miller - vocals
Tommy Church - guitars
Sean Robbins - bass guitar
Matt Johnson - guitars
Nick Gelyon - drums
Jason Suecof and Mark Lewis - engineering, mixing
Jason Suecof - additional vocals and solo on "Embrace the Gutter"

References

2006 albums
The Autumn Offering albums
Victory Records albums
Albums produced by Jason Suecof